Sadat Tebazaalwa (born October 23, 1985) is a Ugandan amateur boxer who participated in the 2004 Summer Olympics. There he was defeated in the first round of the welterweight division by China's Kanat Islam.

He qualified for the Athens Games by winning the gold medal at the 2nd AIBA African 2004 Olympic Qualifying Tournament in Gaborone, Botswana. In the final he defeated Zambia's Ellis Chibuye. In 2003, Tebazaalwa won the bronze medal in his weight division at the All-Africa Games in Abuja, Nigeria.

References
Profile

1985 births
Olympic boxers of Uganda
Living people
Boxers at the 2004 Summer Olympics
Welterweight boxers
Light-welterweight boxers
Ugandan male boxers
African Games bronze medalists for Uganda
African Games medalists in boxing
Competitors at the 2003 All-Africa Games